Fathi al-Majbari is a Libyan politician who served on the Presidential Council of Libya from 2016 to 2018. He was previously closely allied to the commander of the Petroleum Facilities Guard. Being one of the five Vice Presidents, he resigned from the council in July 2018, after being investigated for corruption. He later tried to appoint himself the head of the National Oil Corporation, but this failed.

References

Living people
Government ministers of Libya
Members of the Presidential Council (Libya)
Year of birth missing (living people)